David Kuijken is a Dutch pianist.

He has performed internationally since he debuted in 1984 at the Queen Elizabeth Hall. Kuijken forms a duo with Brenno Ambrosini, with whom he shared palmares at the XI Paloma O'Shea Santander International Piano Competition in Santander. He's known for his work on Dutch contemporary music.

He teaches at the Royal Conservatory of The Hague and the Conservatorium van Amsterdam.

References
 The Hague's Royal Conservatory
 ArkivMusic (Kuijken's recordings)

Dutch classical pianists
Prize-winners of the Paloma O'Shea International Piano Competition
Academic staff of the Conservatorium van Amsterdam
Living people
Academic staff of the Royal Conservatory of The Hague
21st-century classical pianists
Year of birth missing (living people)